William Rickarby Campbell (6 February 1840–20 August 1918) was a New Zealand presbyterian minister. He was born in Ratnagiri, India on 6 February 1840.

References

1840 births
1918 deaths
New Zealand Presbyterians
British people in colonial India